Perry Municipal Airport  is a city-owned public-use airport located five nautical miles (9 km) north of the central business district of Perry, a city in Noble County, Oklahoma, United States. This airport is included in the FAA's National Plan of Integrated Airport Systems for 2009–2013, which categorized it as a general aviation facility.

History
Established as Noble Army Airfield and activated on 11 February 1942.  Assigned to the USAAF Gulf Coast Training Center (later Central Flying Training Command) as a basic (level 1) pilot training airfield.  Operated by the Enid Flying School as an auxiliary to Enid Army Airfield.

Flying training was performed with Fairchild PT-19s as the primary trainer. Also had several PT-17 Stearmans and a few P-40 Warhawks assigned.  Inactivated 28 October with the drawdown of AAFTC's pilot training program and was declared surplus and turned over to the Army Corps of Engineers.  Eventually discharged to the War Assets Administration (WAA) and deeded to the City of Perry as a commercial airport.

Facilities and aircraft 
It has one runway designated 17/35 with an asphalt surface measuring 5,110 by 75 feet (1,558 x 23 m).

For the 12-month period ending November 4, 2009, the airport had 30,000 aircraft operations, an average of 82 per day: 60% military and 40% general aviation. At that time there were 21 aircraft based at this airport: 76% single-engine, 10% multi-engine, 5% helicopter and 10% ultralight.

See also

 Oklahoma World War II Army Airfields

References

External links
 
 

1943 establishments in Oklahoma
Airports established in 1943
Airports in Oklahoma
Buildings and structures in Noble County, Oklahoma
Airfields of the United States Army Air Forces in Oklahoma
USAAF Contract Flying School Airfields